Sarjarao Suryavanshi (born 1926) was an Indian wrestler. He competed in the men's freestyle featherweight at the 1948 Summer Olympics.

References

External links
 

1926 births
Possibly living people
Indian male sport wrestlers
Olympic wrestlers of India
Wrestlers at the 1948 Summer Olympics
Place of birth missing